SS Rufus C. Dawes was a Liberty ship built in the United States during World War II. She was named after Rufus C. Dawes, an American businessman in oil and banking from Ohio. In the 1920s he served as an expert on the commissions to prepare the Dawes Plan and the Young Plan to manage German reparations to the Allies after World War I.

Construction
Rufus C. Dawes was laid down on 31 May 1943, under a Maritime Commission (MARCOM) contract, MC hull 1204, by the St. Johns River Shipbuilding Company, Jacksonville, Florida; she was sponsored by Mrs. Harry B. Hoyt, sister of the namesake, and launched on 4 September 1943.

History
She was allocated to the Luckenbach Steamship Co., Inc., on 18 September 1943. On 14 November 1946, she was placed in the National Defense Reserve Fleet, Astoria, Oregon. On 21 June 1955, she was withdrawn from the fleet to be loaded with grain under the "Grain Program 1955", she returned empty on 28 June 1955. She was sold for scrapping, 29 February 1968, to Oregon Shipwreckers, Inc., for $50,985.57. She was withdrawn from the fleet, 26 March 1968.

References

Bibliography

 
 
 
 

 

Liberty ships
Ships built in Jacksonville, Florida
1943 ships
Astoria Reserve Fleet
Astoria Reserve Fleet Grain Program